Winged Creatures can refer to one of the following:
 Winged Creatures (film), a 2009 film starring Forest Whitaker.
 Winged Creatures (novel), a drama novel written by Roy Freirich.